Heidi Alexander (born 17 April 1975) is a British politician who served as Deputy Mayor of London for Transport from 2018 to 2021. A member of the Labour Party, she was Member of Parliament (MP) for Lewisham East from 2010 to 2018. Alexander served as Shadow Secretary of State for Health from 2015 to 2016.

Early life and career

Alexander was born in Swindon, Wiltshire to Malcolm, an electrician, and Elaine Alexander. She was educated at Churchfields Comprehensive School and New College Sixth Form. Alexander studied at Grey College, Durham, where she received a BA in geography and an MA in European Urban and Regional Change. 

Alexander had a 6-month placement in the office of Cherie Blair at 10 Downing Street in 1998. She worked as a Parliamentary researcher for Lewisham MP Joan Ruddock from 1999 to 2005, and as campaigns manager for the charity Clothes Aid from 2005 to 2006.

Political career

Local government 
Alexander served as a Member of Lewisham London Borough Council for Evelyn ward from 2004 to 2010. She was Deputy Mayor of Lewisham and Cabinet Member for Regeneration from 2006 to 2010. Alexander was selected as the Labour candidate for Lewisham East in October 2009, and elected to Parliament at the 2010 general election.

House of Commons 
Shortly after her election to Parliament, Alexander was appointed Parliamentary Private Secretary to the Shadow Environment, Food and Rural Affairs team. She became an Opposition Whip in 2012, and was promoted to Deputy Shadow Minister for London and senior Opposition Whip in 2013. She served as a member of the Communities and Local Government Committee from 2010 to 2012 and Health Committee from 2016 to 2017.

Following Jeremy Corbyn's election as Labour leader in September 2015, Alexander joined the shadow cabinet as Shadow Secretary of State for Health. She became the first shadow cabinet minister to resign in June 2016, calling for a new party leader after the EU referendum and dismissal of Hilary Benn. In an opinion piece for The Guardian, Alexander wrote "I loved being the shadow health secretary. But I hated being part of the shadow cabinet...because it was entirely dysfunctional" and "so inept, so unprofessional, so shoddy".

Deputy Mayor of London 
In May 2018, Alexander resigned her seat in Parliament to become Deputy Mayor of London for Transport under Sadiq Khan. She served as Deputy Chair of Transport for London in her role, and remained on the body's board until the opening of Crossrail. 

During her time in the role, she was tasked with maintaining London transport during the COVID-19 pandemic and leading several rounds of government bailout negotiations. She notably worked to tackle delays to the opening of Crossrail and re-opening of Hammersmith Bridge, and took up cycling to promote that method of transport. Initially planning to step-down at the end of Khan's first term until the pandemic, she departed her role in 2022 to "consider her next career move".

In June 2022, Alexander announced her intention to seek selection as the Labour candidate for South Swindon. She was selected in July 2022 as prospective parliamentary candidate for the next general election.

Political views 
European Union

Alexander opposed the triggering of Article 50 following the EU referendum, proposing a "reasoned amendment" in January 2017 to throw-out the article. She co-founded the Labour Campaign for the Single Market in 2017, and is a supporter of the pro-EU group Open Britain.

Labour Party

Alexander supported Andy Burnham in the 2010 and 2015 Labour leadership elections, and Owen Smith in the 2016 Labour leadership election. She chaired Sadiq Khan's campaign for the 2016 London mayoral election.

References

External links

Heidi Alexander Profile at labour.org.uk 
Heidi Alexander Profile at New Statesman 
Heidi Alexander on Twitter

|-

1975 births
Living people
Alumni of Grey College, Durham
Councillors in the London Borough of Lewisham
Female members of the Parliament of the United Kingdom for English constituencies
Labour Party (UK) MPs for English constituencies
People from Swindon
UK MPs 2010–2015
UK MPs 2015–2017
UK MPs 2017–2019
21st-century British women politicians
21st-century English women
21st-century English people
Women councillors in England
Shadow Secretaries of State for Health